Vinidarius (fl. 5th century AD) was the purported compiler of a small collection of cooking recipes named Apici excerpta a Vinidario. This is preserved in a single 8th‑century uncial manuscript in Latin, claiming to be excerpts from the recipes of Apicius.

About Vinidarius himself nothing is known. If he existed, he may have been a Goth; his Latin name suggests a possible Gothic name of Vinithaharjis.

There is a very abbreviated epitome entitled Apici excerpta a Vinidario, a "pocket Apicius" by "an illustrious man" named Vinidarius, made as late as the Carolingian era. There is in fact very little overlap with the Apician manual, but the recipes are similar in character, and are usually presented today as an appendix to Apicius: they add to our knowledge of late Antique cuisine.

Bibliography
, pp. 309–325

5th-century Latin writers
5th-century Romans of Gothic descent
Cookbook writers